Barbara Oteng Gyasi (born 5 October 1964)  is a Ghanaian politician and the former Member of Parliament of Prestea Huni-Valley constituency of the Western Region of Ghana. She is a member of the New Patriotic Party (NPP), and was a Deputy Minister for Lands and Natural Resources in Ghana and also the former Minister of Tourism, Culture and Creative Arts.

Early life and education 
Gyasi was born on 5 October 1964. She has a degree in law from the University of Ghana. She holds a Bachelor of Law from the Ghana School of Law.

Career 
She worked as the head of legal department in Vivo Energy Ghana Limited from 2012 to 2016.

Politics 
As the NPP candidate, Barbara was elected to represent the Prestea Huni-Valley Constituency in 2016, but failed to retain the seat in the 2020 Ghanaian elections, as she lost to Wisdom Cudjoe of the National Democratic Congress (NDC).

Personal life 
Oteng Gyasi is a Christian.

References

1964 births
Living people
New Patriotic Party politicians
Ghanaian MPs 2017–2021
People from Western Region (Ghana)
Women members of the Parliament of Ghana
Government ministers of Ghana
Women government ministers of Ghana
21st-century Ghanaian women politicians
University of Ghana alumni
Ghana School of Law alumni